Portia Munson (born 1961) is an American visual artist who works in sculpture, installation, painting and digital photography, focusing on themes related to the environment and feminism. Her work includes large-scale agglomerations of mass-produced plastic found objects arranged by color, as well as small oil paintings of individual domestic found objects, and digital photographs of flowers, weeds and dead animals found near her home in upstate New York.

Education 
Munson received a BFA from Cooper Union School of Art in 1983 and earned an MFA from Mason Gross School of Art at Rutgers University in 1990. She also studied at the Skowhegan School of Painting and Sculpture in Skowhegan, Maine in 1987.

Career 
Munson first achieved notoriety with her work “Pink Project: Table” in the "Bad Girls" show at the New Museum, New York, in 1994. That piece, consisting of thousands of pink plastic found objects spread out on a table, also appeared in Munson's 1994 solo show at Yoshii Gallery in New York, along with sculptures comprising accumulations of pink objects encased in glass vitrines. Critic Amanda Boetzkes writes: "A key aspect of Munson’s practice is the reorganization of these objects according to new taxonomies, sometimes classifying according to size, shape, and shade, while at other times she resorts to haphazard gathering, mounding, and containing."  She goes on to explain that "Pink Project" "summarizes a hyperbolic femininity produced and mediated through the dissemination of products: girls’ dolls, baby pacifiers, hair accessories, mirrors, fake nails, cleaning products, and so on." Writing in the New York Times, Holland Cotter said, “Both assemblages generate a number of ideas, from how a culture infantilizes women and then markets that notion of femininity, to the way practically everyone shapes a sense of self through the accumulation of disposable things.” “Pink Project: Table” was shown again in 2016 at the Frieze Art Fair, London.

Boetzkes further characterizes "Pink Projects" and another work, "Green Piece", as considering "the cultural significance of commodities through their accumulation and redistribution." She goes on to explain that in her view, Munson's work "can be taken as a protracted meditation on the materiality of plastic, as objects cycle from absurd commodity to meaningless thing to excessive substance." In "Green Piece," Boetzkes explains that "green politics is made explicit, as green is shown in the proliferation of objects needed to tend suburban lawns – fly swatters, lawn furniture, garden hoses, yard tools, AstroTurf, bug spray – alongside plastic cucumbers and artificial plants."

Munson is the recipient of several notable fellowship / residencies, including ones at Yaddo in 1999, The MacDowell Colony in 1992, 1993, and 1998. She has also been a visiting artist / lecturer at a number of prestigious institutions, including Yale School of Art, Rhode Island School of Design, The New Museum for Contemporary Art, Parsons School of Design, CAL Arts, and Massachusetts College of Art, among others.

Munson was commissioned in 2012 by the Arts and Design program of New York City's Metropolitan Transportation Authority to create a permanent laminated glass display for the Fort Hamilton Parkway station, on the elevated portion of the West End (D train) line. Munson's artwork “Gardens of Fort Hamilton Parkway Station” consists of symmetrical arrangements of flowers, florets, petals and weeds from her own garden.

Her work is in the collections of the Pennsylvania Academy of the Fine Arts, Philadelphia; 21C International Contemporary Art Museum, Louisville, Ky., and the Nerman Museum of Contemporary Art, Kansas City, Mo.

Exhibitions 
2017 “The Garden,” PPOW Gallery, New York
2015 “Dear Mother Nature,” Mills Gallery, Central College, Pella, Iowa
2015 “Botanicals Below Bryant Park,” MTA Bryant Park Station, New York
2013 “Reflecting Pool,” PPOW Gallery, New York
2011 “Color Forms,” Mass MoCa, North Adams, Mass.
2010 “Portia Munson,” Liebowitz Gallery, Bard College at Simon's Rock, Great Barrington, Mass.
2007 “Green,” PPOW Gallery, New York
2005 “Flower Mandalas,” PPOW Gallery, New York
2001 “Green Piece: Lawn,” School House Center, Silas-Kenyon Gallery, Provincetown, Mass.
1996 “The Garden,” Yoshii Gallery, New York
1994 “Portia Munson,” Yoshii Gallery, New York
1994 “Bad Girls,” New Museum, New York

References

External links 

21st-century American artists
1961 births
Living people
American women painters
American women sculptors
American women installation artists
American installation artists
Rutgers University alumni
Cooper Union alumni
21st-century American women photographers
21st-century American photographers
Skowhegan School of Painting and Sculpture alumni